The 1987 Women's African Volleyball Championship was the Third Edition African continental volleyball Championship for women in Africa and it was held in Casablanca, Morocco, with Six teams participated.

Teams

Final ranking

References

1987 Women
African championship, Women
Women's African Volleyball Championship
International volleyball competitions hosted by Morocco